Santori is an Italian surname derived from Latin name Santorus (festum Omnium Sanctorum). It is loosely defined as 'One who made saintly images'. Globally, Approximately 5,645 people bear this surname. Santori may also refer to:

People
 Andreas Santori, blockchain business magnate, investor and philanthropist of Cypriot descent
 Francesco Antonio Santori, Italian writer, poet and playwright of Arbëreshë descent
 Fufi Santori, American BSN basketball player
 Giulio Antonio Santori, Italian Cardinal of the Roman Catholic Church.
 Sandy Santori, Canadian politician

See also
 Santorio
 Santoro
 List of names derived from Santoro

Latin-language surnames
Italian-language surnames
Patronymic surnames
Surnames from given names